Soraia André César (born August 9, 1964) is a female judoka from Brazil. She competed for her native country at the 1992 Summer Olympics in Barcelona, Spain, where she was defeated in the first round of the repêchage.

In 1980, André participated in the first World Judo Championships in New York, where she lost in the first round. At the 1983 Pan American Games in Caracas, Venezuela, André won the bronze medal in the heavyweight division.

André also competed at the 1988 Summer Olympics, when women's judo was a demonstration sport. She won a bronze medal at the 1991 Pan American Games in the Women's Heavyweight (+ 72 kg), after having gained gold four years earlier in Indianapolis, United States.

References

 

1964 births
Living people
Judoka at the 1988 Summer Olympics
Judoka at the 1992 Summer Olympics
Olympic judoka of Brazil
Brazilian female judoka
Pan American Games gold medalists for Brazil
Pan American Games bronze medalists for Brazil
Pan American Games medalists in judo
Judoka at the 1983 Pan American Games
Judoka at the 1987 Pan American Games
Judoka at the 1991 Pan American Games
Medalists at the 1983 Pan American Games
Medalists at the 1987 Pan American Games
Medalists at the 1991 Pan American Games
21st-century Brazilian women
20th-century Brazilian women